Chekmagush (Saqmağoş) is a rural locality (a selo) and the administrative center of Chekmagushevsky District in the Republic of Bashkortostan, Russia. As of the 2010 Census, its population was 11,382.

History
It was first attested in 1765 and named after a hydronym.

References

Notes

Sources

Rural localities in Chekmagushevsky District